A goal is an objective that a person or a system plans or intends to achieve.

Goal may also refer to:

Sport
 Goal (sports), a method of scoring in many sports, or the physical structure or area where scoring occurs
 Goals, the goal frame in association football
 Scoring in association football, goal scored when the ball passes completely over a goal line
 Goal (ice hockey), scored when the puck completely crosses the goal line
 Scoring in Gaelic games, for games such as hurling, camogie, and Gaelic football
 Drop goal, a scoring method used in rugby
 Field goal, a scoring method used in American and Canadian football
 Field goal (basketball), a basket scored on any shot other than a free throw

Arts, entertainment and media

Films
 Goal (1936 film), a 1936 Argentine sports film directed by Luis Moglia Barth
 Goal! (film series), a trilogy of football films
 Goal! (film), 2005 British film
Goal II: Living the Dream, 2007 sequel
Goal III: Taking on the World, 2009 straight-to-DVD release
 Goal (2007 Hindi film), a 2007 Bollywood Hindi-language film based on football in the Asian community in England; titled Dhan Dhana Dhan Goal in India.
 Goal (2007 Malayalam film), a 2007 Malayalam film directed by Kamal
 Goal (2018 film), a 2018 Sinhala film
 Goal!, the 1966 official FIFA World Cup film

Games
 Goal! (video game), a 1988 game for the Nintendo Entertainment System
 Dino Dini's Goal, a 1993 game for Amiga, Atari ST and PC

Literature
 Goal (children's novel), a children's novel by Michael Hardcastle
 The Goal (novel), a 1984 management-oriented novel by Eliyahu M. Goldratt

Other uses
 GOAL (organization), a charitable organisation founded by Irish humanitarian John O'Shea
 Goal (website), a football news website owned by FootballCo.
 Goal mac Morn or Goll mac Morna, a character in Irish mythology
 Global Overseas Adoptees' Link, a South Korean agency that aids Korean overseas adoptees
 GOAL agent programming language, a high-level programming language for programming rational agents
 Game Oriented Assembly Lisp, a video game programming language
 A trade name for the herbicide oxyfluorfen

See also
 Gaol or jail, a prison or remand center
 Goal line (disambiguation)
 Gol (disambiguation)
 Gole (disambiguation)
 Object (disambiguation)
 Objective (disambiguation)
 Purpose (disambiguation)
 Targeting (disambiguation)